Scutchamer Knob, also known as Cuckhamsley Hill and occasionally as Scotsman's Knob or Beacon Hill, is an early Iron Age round barrow on the Ridgeway National Trail at East Hendred Down in the English county of Oxfordshire (formerly in Berkshire).

Originally called Cwichelmeshlaew or Cwichelm's Barrow, it is recorded as having been the place where King Edwin of Northumbria killed Cwichelm of Wessex in AD 636 and, in the Middle Ages, became the meeting point of the shire moot (or market) which was abolished in 1620. It was long thought to be the actual burial place of Cwichelm but the mound has been excavated several times without serious finds. In 1006, the Anglo-Saxon Chronicle states that the Danes marched to Cuckhamsley Hill as they believed that if they reached the Hill, they would never return to the sea.

The knob appears to have once been a round barrow, but now is a semi-circular bank with a round front.  Its appearance may have changed in part due to vandalism based on the belief it was used to hoard treasure.

The name "Scutchamer" may have derived from "Cwichelmeshlaew".  An alternate explanation is that the name is based on the word "scutcher", someone who "scutched" or beat out flax to loosen its fibres, and the knob was a location of local fairs trading in local products deriving from this practice.

References 
 Adkins, R and Petchey, M. (1984). Secklow hundred mound and other meeting place mounds in England in the Archaeological Journal 141: 243-251
 Curtis, N., (1998). National Trail Guide: The Ridgeway
 East Hendred Parish Council. East Hendred Millennium Record
 Ford, David Nash (2001). Royal Berkshire History: East Hendred
 Hewett, William. The History and Antiquities of the Hundred of Compton, Berkshire
 Williams, Howard. Death and Memory in Early Medieval Britain. Cambridge: Cambridge University Press

Buildings and structures in Oxfordshire
History of Berkshire
History of Oxfordshire
Iron Age sites in England
Archaeological sites in Oxfordshire